Hollins is an area of Oldham, Greater Manchester, England, 1.7 miles south of the town centre.

Formerly a hamlet set amongst open moorland and farmland along Hollins Road, the 19th century growth of Oldham saw Hollins form a contiguous urban area with Hollinwood, Limeside, Garden Suburb, Werneth, Coppice and Copster Hill.

Amenities

Hollins Fire Station opened in 1981 to replace the now demolished Werneth Fire Station.

The area is served by Lyndhurst Primary School. It was formerly served by Hollins Comprehensive School.

Hollins Methodist Church on Millgate has served the area since 1840. A Buddhist Temple, Ketumani Buddhist Vihara, was established in Hollins in 2000, although it subsequently relocated to Manchester.

Merton Playing Fields is the last remaining undeveloped land in the area.

Transport
First Greater Manchester provides the following bus services along Hollins Road:

180 providing services to Greenfield via Oldham and to Manchester via Failsworth.

184 to Huddersfield via Oldham and Uppermill and to Manchester via Failsworth.

Stagecoach Manchester provides service 76 to Oldham and to Manchester via Limeside and Newton Heath.

References

Areas of Oldham